Villacarrillo is a locality and Spanish municipality located in the south-western part of the region of Las Villas, in the province of Jaén. It borders the municipalities of Santisteban del Puerto, Iznatoraf, Villanueva del Arzobispo, Santiago-Pontones, Santo Tomé, Úbeda (by the enclave known as Rincón de Úbeda), and Sabiote.

The municipality includes the population centers of Villacarrillo - which hosts the capital of the Las Villas region -, Mogón, La Caleruela, Agrupación de Mogón y Arroturas. It has a population of 10,902 inhabitants.

References

Municipalities in the Province of Jaén (Spain)